Renato Cirell Czerna (São Paulo, January 26, 1922 - March 19, 2005) was a Brazilian lawyer, professor and writer.

He was a professor at University of São Paulo, University of Rome and University of Naples.

Books 

 Natureza e espírito. Prefácio de Miguel Reale. São Paulo: Martins, 1949. 143 p.

 A dialética do “Faust”. São Paulo, 1950.

 Filosofia como conceito e história. São Paulo, 1950. (Tese).

 A filosofia jurídica de Benedetto Croce: situação e crítica do sistema no historicismo italiano                          contemporâneo. São Paulo: Revista dos Tribunais. 1955. 235 p.

 Ensaios de filosofia jurídica e social. São Paulo: Saraiva, 1965. 236 p.

 O direito e o estado no idealismo germânico: posições de Schelling e Hegel. São Paulo, 1981. 250 p. 

 Justiça e História: ensaios. Apresentação Ubiratan de Macedo. São Paulo: Convívio/Editora                          Universidade de São Paulo, 1987. 459 p. (Biblioteca do pensamento brasileiro, 7).

 O pensamento filosófico e jurídico de Miguel Reale. São Paulo: Saraiva, 1999. 190 p.

References 

Academic staff of the University of São Paulo
2005 deaths
1922 births
20th-century Brazilian lawyers
Brazilian philosophers